Nouakchott (originally derived from , "place of the winds") is the capital and largest city of Mauritania. It is one of the largest cities in the Sahel. The city also serves as the administrative and economic center of Mauritania.

Nouakchott was a mid-sized village of little importance until 1958 when it was chosen as the capital of the nascent nation of Mauritania. At the time, it was designed and built to accommodate 15,000 people. However, beginning in the 1970s, a vast number of Mauritanians began moving to Nouakchott because environmental conditions in their home villages had become too harsh due to drought and increasing desertification. , the city had a population of just under a million people. Many of the newcomers settled in  slum areas of the city that were poorly maintained and extremely overcrowded. However, more recently, the living conditions of some of these inhabitants have improved.

The city is the hub of the Mauritanian economy. It is home to a deepwater port and Nouakchott–Oumtounsy International Airport, one of the country's two international airports. It also hosts the University of Nouakchott and several other more specialized institutions of higher learning.

History

Nouakchott was a large, fortified fishing village (ksar) in pre-colonial times and under French rule. As Mauritania prepared for independence, it lacked a capital city. The area of present-day Nouakchott was chosen by Moktar Ould Daddah, the first President of Mauritania, and his advisors. Ould Daddah desired the new capital to symbolise modernity and national unity, which ruled out existing cities or towns in the interior. The village was selected as the capital city for its central location between Saint-Louis, Senegal, the city from which the colony of Mauritania was governed, and Nouadhibou. Its location also meant that it avoided the sensitive issue of whether the capital was built in an area dominated by the Arab-descended Moors or Black Africans.

Construction began in March 1958 to enlarge the village to house a population of 15,000, and the basics were completed by the time that the French granted independence on 28 November 1960. Nouakchott was planned with the expectation that commerce and other economic activities would not take place in the city. Nouakchott's central business district was planned with broad streets and a grid-like structure; the new Cinquième Quartier (Fifth District) was located close to this area and became the location of a large open-air market and residential area within a few years. During the 1960s, the city obtained its own local government. By the 1970s, these new areas had grown so much that they replaced the old ksar in terms of importance, as they also hosted the governmental buildings and state enterprises.

The city was attacked twice in 1976 by the Polisario Front during the Western Sahara conflict, but the guerrillas caused little damage. The city has had massive and unconstrained growth, driven by the North African drought, since the beginning of the 1970s; hundreds of thousands moved there in search of a better life. The official censuses showed 134,000 residents in 1977 and 393,325 in 1988, although both figures were probably smaller than reality. The population is now estimated to consist of at least one third of the country's population of 3.2 million, and the 2013 census showed a population of 958,399.

Geography

Located on the Atlantic coast of the Sahara Desert, it lies on the west coast of Africa. With the exception of Friendship Port and a small fishing port, the coastal strip is mostly left empty and allowed to flood. The coastline includes shifting sandbanks and sandy beaches. There are areas of quicksand close to the harbor. Nouakchott is largely flat and only a few meters above sea level. It is threatened by the sand dunes advancing from its eastern side which pose a daily problem. There have been efforts to save particular areas, including work by Jean Meunier. Owing to the rapid build-up, the city is quite spread out, with few tall buildings. Most buildings are one-story.

Nouakchott is built around a large tree-lined street, Avenue Gamal Abdel Nasser, which runs northeast through the city centre from the airport. It divides the city into two, with the residential areas in the north and the medina quarter, along with the kebbe, a shanty town formed due to the displacement of people from other areas by the desert. Other major streets are named (in French) for notable Mauritanian or international figures of the 1960s: Avenue Abdel Nasser, Avenue Charles de Gaulle, Avenue Kennedy, and Avenue Lumumba, for example.

The kebbe consists of cement buildings that are built overnight and made to look permanent to avoid destruction by the authorities. In 1999, it was estimated that more than half of the city's inhabitants lived in tents and shacks, which were used for residential as well as business purposes. The city is broken into nine arrondissements, sub-divided into alphabetised Îlots. These are Teyarett, Ksar, Tevragh Zeïna, Toujournine, Sebkha, El Mina, Dar Naïm, Arafat and Riad. The Sebkha (Cinquième) Arrondissement is home to a large shopping area.

Climate
Nouakchott features a hot desert climate (Köppen: BWh) with hot temperatures throughout the year but cool winter night temperatures. Due to the city's oceanside location, Nouakchott is generally not quite as hot as other cities with this climate. Still, the city can experience sweltering days. Minimum temperatures can be as low as  during winter nights in Nouakchott. Average rainfall in the city is  a year.

Climate change 
A 2019 paper published in PLOS One estimated that under Representative Concentration Pathway 4.5, a "moderate" scenario of climate change where global warming reaches ~ by 2100, the climate of Nouakchott in the year 2050 would most closely resemble the current climate of Khartoum.

Sustainability 
Responding to a 450% projected increase in electricity demand between 2010 and 2030, Nouakchott's Sheikh Zayed solar power plant was completed in 2012 and is considered the largest solar power plant in Africa. The desert climate causes dust accumulation, which negatively impacts the performance of photovoltaic solar panels.

Government

Nouakchott is divided into three administrative regions (wilayat) led by governors appointed by the central government, each of which contains three departments (moughataa):

 Nouakchott-Nord (North Nouakchott): Dar-Naim, Teyarett, Toujouonine
 Nouakchott-Ouest (West Nouakchott): Ksar, Sebkha, Tevragh-Zeina
 Nouakchott-Sud (South Nouakchott): Arafat, El Mina, Riyad

Separate from the wilayat, a directly elected regional council was established in Nouakchott in 2018, which took over the roles of promoting social and economic development from the communauté urbaine of Nouakchott which it replaced. Fatimatou Abdel Malick was elected council president in September 2018.

Nouakchott was initially divided into four departments in 1973. In 1986 the current nine departments were created.

Formerly a district, in 1990 Nouakchott became a region of Mauritania. On 25 November 2014, it was split into the three current regions, and its governor Mahi Ould Hamed became the first governor of Nouakchott-Nord.

Demographics

For comparison, its population was only 20,000 in 1969. Part of the difficulty in estimating the city's population is that part of it is nomadic, setting up tents in suitable locations, then packing up when the need strikes. Some estimates put the 2008 population at over 2 million. The 2013 census gave the city's population as 958,399.

Slum resettlement
In 2009, the government of Mauritania announced that it would begin a process of clearing the slum on the outskirts of Nouakchott, as 24,000 families would eventually be relocated to planned housing in the city. The process was scheduled to begin with the relocation of 9,000 families from the outskirts into the poor Arafat department neighborhood of "Kosovo", popularly named for its high crime rate and poor services. The government planned to begin moving families in June 2009, despite concerns from aid agencies that needed infrastructure could not be put in place in the receiving neighborhood. In 2013, it was reported that "slums have been replaced by social dwellings for the poorest", with the World Bank reporting that the plan met with substantial success, resulting in access to improved services for 181,035 people in the slum areas.

Economy

Nouakchott is the center of the Mauritanian economy, with three-quarters of service sector enterprises located in the city  with 90% of the city's economic activity consisting of informal transactions. Some inhabitants have multiple addresses and maintain strong ties with their regions of origin, at times returning for labor.

Transport 
Nouakchott has a Chinese-built deepwater port that opened in 1986. As of 2011, the World Bank was investigating funding a new shipping container facility at the port.

Air service is provided by Nouakchott–Oumtounsy International Airport, which replaced the previous Nouakchott International Airport in June 2016.

The Cairo–Dakar Highway leg from Nouakchott to Nouadhibou was paved in 2004, although the Nouakchott-Rosso leg was paved before independence. A  road (Route d'Espoir (Road of Hope)) connects the city with Néma via Boutilimit and Kiffa. In the city, there is a public transport and commuter system, with vehicles serving major boulevards.

On July 2022 a tramway project was presented, without a scheduled opening date.

Education
The city is home to the University of Nouakchott Al Aasriya, the main university in Mauritania, opened in 1981. As of 1995, it had 70 professors and 2,800 students.

Other higher education facilities include the Lebanese International University of Mauritania, the National School of Administration, the College of Science and Technology and the Higher Scientific Institute.

There are many primary and secondary schools, among the most prominent are the American International School of Nouakchott and the Lycée Français Théodore Monod.

Culture 

Attractions in Nouakchott include the National Museum of Mauritania, the National Library and the National Archives. The city hosts several markets, including the Marocaine market and the beaches. One beach is devoted to fishing boats where fish can be bought fresh at the Fish market. Nouakchott is a principal selling place of native Saharan meteorites.

Places of worship 
Among the places of worship, they are predominantly Muslim mosques. There are also Christian churches and temples : Roman Catholic Diocese of Nouakchott (Catholic Church),  Protestant churches, Evangelical Churches.

Sport
Nouakchott hosts six of the fourteen teams of the Mauritanian Premier League.

Twin towns – Sister cities
Nouakchott is twinned with:
 Madrid, Spain (1986)
 Amman, Jordan (1999)
 Lanzhou, China (2000)

See also 

 List of cities in Mauritania
 Transport in Mauritania

References

Further reading

 Armelle Choplin et Riccardo Ciavolella, 2008. " Marges de la ville en marge du politique ? Logiques d’exclusion, de dépendance et d’autonomie à Nouakchott (Mauritanie) », Autrepart, n°45. 
 Choplin A., 2006. Fabriquer des villes-capitales entre monde arabe et Afrique noire: Nouakchott (Mauritanie) et Khartoum (Soudan), étude comparée. Université Paris 1, 535 p. 
 Choplin A., 2006. Le foncier urbain en Afrique: entre informel et rationnel,  de Nouakchott, Mauritanie, Les annales de géographie, n°647, pp. 69–91. 
 Anne-Marie Frérot, Nouakchott, du puits nomade à la ville des pétroliers. Risques et représentations, Maghreb-Machrek, n°190, c. December 2006 – 2007. 
 Philippe Tanguy, « L'urbanisation irrégulière à Nouakchott: 1960-2000 », Insaniyat, n°22, October - December 2003, (vol. VII, 4). 
 Diagana I., 1993. Croissance urbaine et dynamique spatiale à Nouakchott, Thèse doct.: géographie: Lyon II, 314 p.  
 Pitte J.-R., 1977. Nouakchott, capitale de la Mauritanie. Paris : Univ. de Paris-Sorbonne, p. 200.  
 Mohamed Salem Ideidbi, Mauritanie : la Richesse d'une nation, Nouakchott, al-Manar, 2011.

External links

  

 
Capitals in Africa
Planned cities
Populated coastal places in Mauritania
Populated places in Mauritania
Populated places established in 1659